Barbara Frietchie, The Frederick Girl is a play in four acts by Clyde Fitch and based on the heroine of John Greenleaf Whittier's poem "Barbara Frietchie" (based on a real person: Barbara Fritchie). Fitch takes a good bit of artistic liberty and intertwines her story with that of his own grandparents' love story, which also takes place during the Civil War.   

Barbara Stanwyck took her film name from the name of the play, and  a British actress named Joan Stanwyck who starred in one of the play's productions, perhaps in London.

An illustrated version of the poem is contained in James Thurber's Fables for Our Time and Famous Poems Illustrated.

The play met with mixed reviews in 1899 because of the romance he added to the tale, but it would be successfully revived a number of times. Fritchie, a central figure in the history of Frederick, Maryland, has a stop in the town's walking tour at her home. When Winston Churchill passed through Frederick in 1943, he stopped at the house and recited the poem from memory. At 90 years of age she waved the Union flag out of her window despite opposition from Stonewall Jackson's troops, who were passing through Frederick. This event is the subject of the 1864 poem:

"Shoot, if you must, this old gray head,
But spare your country's flag," she said.
A shade of sadness, a blush of shame,
Over the face of the leader came;
The nobler nature within him stirred
To life at that woman's deed and word;
"Who touches a hair of yon gray head
Dies like a dog! March on!" he said.
Her name was    Barbara   Hauer   Frietchie

Known performances

July, 1899 at the Y.M.C.A. auditorium in Mansfield, Ohio  [source:  Mansfield (OH) News:  11 July 1899]
October 23, 1899–January 1900—Criterion Theatre, Manhattan
February 1900—Poli's Theatre, Naugatuck, Connecticut 
March 19–March 24, 1900—National Theatre, Washington, D.C. Starring Julia Marlowe Presented by Charles Frohman
 October 15, 1900 Chicago, IL with Julia Marlowe & Bruce McRae at grand opening of Illinois Theatre
January 28–March 1901—Academy of Music, Manhattan

External links
Barbara Frietchie at the Internet Broadway Database
 

1899 plays
Plays by Clyde Fitch
Poetry and hymns by John Greenleaf Whittier